Matthew Spriggs is an emeritus professor of archaeology at the School of Archaeology and Anthropology of the Australian National University (ANU) in Canberra. He has made major contributions in the archaeology of Southeast Asia and the Pacific, and is particularly well known for his work investigating the Lapita culture cemetery at Teouma in Vanuatu.

Spriggs is of Cornish descent.

He is a member of the editorial board of World Archaeology journal.

Awards and honors 
Spriggs was awarded an Australian Laureate Fellowship in 2014. He received the  Rhys Jones Medal, the highest honour awarded by the Australian Archaeological Association, in 2022.

References

External links 
 Professor Matthew Spriggs: researcher profile at Australian National University

Living people
Academic staff of the Australian National University
People educated at Upton Court Grammar School
Year of birth missing (living people)
Pacific archaeology